Matías Federico Vaccaneo (born 12 June 1995) is an Argentine professional footballer who plays as a goalkeeper for Sansinena.

Career
Vaccaneo's career began with All Boys, notably appearing for their youth at the 2013 Torneo di Viareggio. He was an unused substitute eighteen times across the 2016–17 and 2017–18 seasons, eventually making his professional deal on the eighteenth occasion after Mariano Ferrero selected him off the substitutes bench in a Primera B Nacional fixture with Atlético de Rafaela on 9 March 2018. His first start arrived nine days later against Boca Unidos, featuring for the full duration of a home defeat as the club went on to suffer relegation to Primera B Metropolitana. Vaccaneo departed to CA San Jorge in 2020, subsequently featuring three times.

In October 2020, Vaccaneo moved up a division to Torneo Federal A after joining Sansinena.

Career statistics
.

References

External links

1995 births
Living people
Footballers from Buenos Aires
Argentine footballers
Association football goalkeepers
Primera Nacional players
All Boys footballers
Club Atlético Sansinena Social y Deportivo players